Robert Altman (1925–2006) was an American film director.

Robert Altman may also refer to:
 Robert Reed Altman (born 1959), American camera operator and director of photography
 Robert Altman (photographer) (1944–2021), American photographer
 Robert A. Altman (1947–2021), American businessman, chairman and CEO of ZeniMax Media
 Bob Altman (1931–2017), American comedian known as Uncle Dirty